Wealden may refer to:

 Wealden District, a local government district in the county of East Sussex, England
 Wealden Group, a group of rock strata in southern England, occasionally also referred to as the Wealden Supergroup
 Wealden iron industry, was located in the Weald of south-eastern England.
 Wealden (UK Parliament constituency), East Sussex constituency in the British House of Commons
 Wealden hall house, is a type of vernacular medieval timber-framed hall house traditional in the south east of England.
 Wealden Lake, a lake that existed during the Cretaceous
 Wealden Line

See also 
 Weald (disambiguation)